The Last 48 Hours of Kurt Cobain is a 2006 BBC documentary about the last hours of the life of Kurt Cobain who was the front man of American grunge band Nirvana.

Premise

The documentary details the last 48 hours of the life of Nirvana front man Kurt Cobain leading up to his death in April 1994, including details such as how he used to frequent the Aurora Avenue in Seattle to use drugs. The documentary was directed by John Dower whose works also included the boxing documentary Thrilla in Manila, and Live Forever: The Rise and Fall of Brit Pop. The Last 48 Hours of Kurt Cobain includes interviews with stars such as Guns N' Roses bassist Duff McKagan, who coincidentally sat next to Cobain on a flight back to Seattle shortly before he committed suicide.

The last 48 hours of Cobain's life was subsequently not detailed in his official 2015 HBO documentary, Kurt Cobain: Montage of Heck.

Reception

In 2015, The Hairpin ranked The Last 48 Hours of Kurt Cobain sixth in their A Definitive Ranking of Every Kurt Cobain Movie Ever Made. In a 2014 review, Open Culture stated that "Much more than its title suggests, the hour and twenty minute doc works well as a biography of Cobain and a brief history of Nirvana and the Seattle scene that birthed them".

References

2006 documentary films
2006 films
British documentary films
Documentary films about rock music and musicians
Films about Kurt Cobain
Documentary films about the Pacific Northwest
2000s English-language films
2000s American films
2000s British films